Visible by Verizon (stylized as v˙s˙ble and also known simply as Visible) is an American mobile virtual network operator (MVNO) owned by Verizon Communications. Visible competes primarily against T-Mobile's Metro by T-Mobile, AT&T's Cricket Wireless and Dish's Boost Mobile as part of the prepaid wireless service provider brands.

History

Visible was launched by Verizon on May 10, 2018 without any prior announcement. At launch, the service was only available by invitation only, and at the time, required users to register via the Visible app or its website. Once registered, Visible would send users a SIM card the next day and once installed, can access the network. In addition, only unlocked phones were available to be used at launch.

About
Visible is an all-digital wireless carrier in the United States, offering unlimited text, talk, data, and hotspot, on Verizon’s 4G LTE and 5G NR Networks. It is owned by Verizon and was founded in 2018. The service supports Apple and Android devices. The service is cheaper than Verizon with the downside being service will be deprioritized if Verizon subscribers in the area are busy on the network, giving Verizon subscribers the faster connection.  

As of May 2021, Angie Klein is CEO.

Visible was named to Fast Company’s Most Innovative Companies list in 2020, and was named Best Telecom Brand by Adweek in 2021. Visible has also won a Shorty Social Good Award for its #VisibleActsofKindness campaign.

In June 2022, Visible was rebranded as Visible by Verizon.

Customer complaints 
The company has faced numerous complaints since its inception related to its lackluster or non-existent customer support, which is only available via chatbot through their Android or iOS app, and social media platforms Facebook and Twitter.  The company has no phone number, and thus no customer support via telephone.   Customer complaints range from weeks long waits for porting in / out to complete, SIM / eSIM provisioning issues,  loss of service for multiple days, failing to honor promotional deals, and charges to credit cards without services provided.  

On April 28, 2021 The Better Business Bureau issued alert posted for the company, citing a pattern of consumer complaints that the company was unresponsive to their request for assistance regarding cellular service and billing and advising consumers to file complaints with the Federal Trade Commission Bureau of Consumer Protection.  The company's score with the Better Business Bureau is B-, with a rating of 1.38/5 stars. 

In a September 20, 2022 article in Fierce Wireless, the company admitted problems with its customer service model.

References

External links
 

Verizon Communications services
Wireless carriers
2018 establishments in the United States
Mobile virtual network operators